Miyanomoto Dam is a dam in Miyazaki Prefecture, Japan. It was completed in 1961.

References 

Dams in Miyazaki Prefecture
Dams completed in 1961